Blair MacKichan is a British musician and songwriter.

He started his musical career playing drums, then later progressed to the piano. As a musician he fronts a band named Blair and Friends.

MacKichan writes a lot of his own material. He won a Brit Award for the 2004 song "Your Game" after it became a hit for Will Young. He also wrote for Lily Allen.

References

External links

1960s births
Living people
English male actors
English pop singers
English male singers
English jazz singers
English songwriters
British male jazz musicians
British male songwriters